Billel Attafen (born July 3, 1985 in Tipaza) is an Algerian football player. He currently plays for MC Alger in the Algerian Ligue Professionnelle 1.

Club career
In the summer of 2009, Attafen joined MC Alger, after spending four seasons with NA Hussein Dey.

International career
On April 27, 2007, Attafen was called up by coach Abdelhafid Tasfaout to the Algerian Under-23 National Team for a training camp in Algiers to prepare for the 2007 All-Africa Games. In November, he was called up again to the team, this time for the 2007 UNAF Under-23 tournament in Tunis which Algeria won 4-2 on penalties in the final against Tunisia.

External links
 DZFoot Profile

References

1985 births
Algerian footballers
Algeria under-23 international footballers
Algerian Ligue Professionnelle 1 players
MC Alger players
NA Hussein Dey players
People from Tipaza
Living people
Association football midfielders
21st-century Algerian people